Lavon is a community settlement in northern Israel. Located in the Galilee four kilometres north of Karmiel, it falls under the jurisdiction of Misgav Regional Council.

History
The village was established in 1980 and was named after former Minister of Defence Pinchas Lavon.

References

Community settlements
Populated places established in 1980
Populated places in Northern District (Israel)
1980 establishments in Israel